Chuck River Wilderness is a  wilderness area located within the Tongass National Forest in the U.S. state of Alaska.  It was designated by the United States Congress in 1990.

Located at the head of Windham Bay, Chuck River Wilderness is adjacent to the Tracy Arm-Fords Terror Wilderness.  The Chuck River flows northward from its headwaters near Port Houghton through dense forest with thick vegetation before emptying into Windham Bay where the historic Chuck Mining Camp operated until the 1920s.  There is private land in the lower river and in portions of the bay where there was once a small settlement.

References

External links
 Chuck River Wilderness - Tongass National Forest
 Chuck River Wilderness - Wilderness.net

Protected areas of Petersburg Borough, Alaska
Wilderness areas of the Tongass National Forest